William Ambrose KC (22 April 1832 – 18 January 1908) was an English judge and Conservative Party politician who sat in the House of Commons from 1885 to 1899.

Life and career
Ambrose was born at Chester, the son of Richard and Mary Ambrose. He was called to the bar at Lincoln's Inn in 1859 and migrated to Middle Temple in 1869. In 1874, he became a Queen's Counsel and in 1881 a bencher. At the 1885 general election he was elected as Conservative MP for Harrow. He held the seat until 1899 when he resigned on being appointed a Master in Lunacy.

Personal life
Ambrose married Georgianna Mary Anne Jones, daughter of William Jones of Camden in 1866 and had several children. The couple lived in 1881 at Westover, West Heath Road, Child's Hill, then narrowly part of Hendon, Middlesex. Ambrose's home as at 1909, per his probate, re-sworn at the sum of £25,315 (rounded) was still that large house "Westover" which enjoyed  postally and so often considered Hampstead, but not in the County of London, rather a true part of Middlesex run by Middlesex County Council of which he was a longer-term representative, an alderman.

Death
He is buried in Highgate Cemetery, in the West Cemetery, along with his wife and her parents.

References

External links 
 

1832 births
1908 deaths
19th-century English judges
Conservative Party (UK) MPs for English constituencies
UK MPs 1885–1886
UK MPs 1886–1892
UK MPs 1892–1895
UK MPs 1895–1900
19th-century King's Counsel
Masters of the High Court (England and Wales)